Donald Andrew Pember (born June 14, 2000) is an American college basketball player for the UNC Asheville Bulldogs of the Big South Conference. He previously played for the Tennessee Volunteers.

Early life and high school
Pember grew up in Knoxville, Tennessee and attended Bearden High School. As a junior, he averaged 10.0 points, 7.0 rebounds, 3.0 blocks, and 2.7 assists per game and was named All-District 4-AAA. Pember was rated a three-star recruit and committed to play college basketball at Tennessee over offers from Davidson, Mercer, and Florida Atlantic.

College career
Pember played in 22 games off the bench for the Tennessee Volunteers and averaged 1.3 points and one rebound per game. He played in 10 games and averaged 2.8 minutes played per game as a sophomore. Pember entered the NCAA transfer portal at the end of the season.

Pember ultimately transferred to UNC Asheville. He was named the Big South Conference Defensive Player of the Year and first team All-Big South after averaging 15.7 points, 6.7 rebounds, and 3.0 blocked shots per game in his first season with the Bulldogs. Pember scored a school-record with 48 points scored in an 88-80 overtime win over Presbyterian. He was named Big South Player of the Year and repeated as Defensive Player of the Year and first team All-Big South at the end of the season. Pember was named the Most Valuable Player of the 2023 Big South Conference men's basketball tournament after scoring 29 points in the final against Campbell.

Personal life
Pember's parents were both college athletes at Carson-Newman University, with his father playing basketball and his mother playing volleyball.

References

External links
Tennessee Volunteers bio
UNC Asheville Bulldogs bio

2000 births
Living people
American men's basketball players
Basketball players from Knoxville, Tennessee
Power forwards (basketball)
Tennessee Volunteers basketball players
UNC Asheville Bulldogs men's basketball players